The sixth season of the Dutch reality singing competition The Voice of Holland premiered on 25 September 2015 on RTL4. Martijn Krabbé, Wendy van Dijk, and Jamai Loman all returned, as did Marco Borsato and Ali B as coaches. However, the sixth season saw Trijntje Oosterhuis and Ilse DeLange replaced by Dutch singer-songwriters Anouk and Sanne Hans from the band Miss Montreal. This is the last season that Marco Borsato appeared as a coach on the show, as he announced on 13 November 2015 that he will not be returning for the next season. In his place, singer Waylon will serve as coach for Season 7. The season was won by Maan de Steenwinkel of Team Borsato, and this is Borsato's fourth time as winning coach.

One of the important premises of the show is the quality of the singing talent. Four coaches, themselves popular performing artists, train the talents in their group and occasionally perform with them. Talents are selected in blind auditions, where the coaches cannot see, but only hear the auditioner.

Coaches
Marco Borsato and Ali B have returned for season 6, while Anouk Teeuwe and Sanne Hans replace former judges Ilse DeLange and Trijntje Oosterhuis.

Teams
Color key

Blind auditions

Color key

Episode 1 (September 25)

Episode 2 (October 2)

Episode 3 (October 9)

Episode 4 (October 16)

Episode 5 (October 23)

Notes

  After singing her blind audition song, contestant Fabiënne Mucuk was requested, by coach Ali B, to sing a second song. She sang "I'm Gonna Find Another You" by John Mayer.

The Battle Rounds 
The battle rounds determine which candidates from each team advance to the Knockout Rounds. Two contestants from within a team sing in a vocal battle against each other, and ultimately, in this season's case, 4 artists from Team Anouk, 6 artists from Team Ali B, and 5 artists from Teams Sanne and Borsato will advance. Continuing from season 4, each coach is allowed to steal one contestant from another coach's team. Continuing from Season 5, the studio audience can vote on contestants (through their own mobile phones). They can vote for that contestant  (red vs. blue), thus helping influence the coach's decision on who moves on.
Color key:

The Knockouts 
New to this season is the introduction of the Knockout Round, which functions to replace the Clash Rounds of Season 5. During this round, coaches Sanne and Marco will advance three artists to the next stage of the competition, the Live Shows, while Anouk and Ali B will advance two and four artists, respectively. This is done to eliminate an equal number of artists across each team, ultimately sending twelve artists through to the Live Shows. In this round, in a format similar to The X Factor's Six-Seat Challenge, there will be three seats (two for Anouk and four for Ali B). After a contestant performs a song of his or her choice, he or she will sit in one of these seats; this will occur for the first three artists (two for Anouk, four for Ali B) performing on a team. However, after these first contestants perform, the fate of the fourth artist (third artist for Anouk and fifth artist for Ali B) will be decided based on whether his or her coach would like to switch out an artist already seated in favor of this performer. In the case of a switch-out, the artist that was switched out will be eliminated, and this performer will sit down. If the coach would instead like to keep the performers already seated and thus not give a seat to this performer, he or she will be immediately eliminated. After all artists have performed, those who end up seated will advance to the Live Shows.

Color key
 – Contestant was eliminated, either immediately (indicated by a "—" in the "Switched with" column) or switched with another contestant
 – Contestant was not switched out and advanced to the Live Shows

Live Shows
The final phase of the competition, the Live Shows, started on December 4, 2015. Unlike previous seasons, in which an equal number of contestants on each team were eliminated every week, results will apply to the contestants regardless of their teams.

Color key:

Week 1: Top 12 (December 4)

Week 2: Top 10 (December 11)
This week, the one artist with the lowest number of public votes will be eliminated, leaving nine artists to compete the following week.

Week 3: Top 9 (December 18)

Notes

  This is a reworked Dutch version of James Morrison's "You Give Me Something".

Week 4: Top 8 (January 8)

Week 5: Top 7 (January 15)

Notes

  To commemorate singer David Bowie after his death, Jennie Lena and Ivan Peroti, accompanied on piano by Jamai Loman, performed "Let's Dance" and "This is Not America" respectively backstage.

Week 6: Semi-Final - Top 6 (January 22)
This week, after all of the artists have performed their first songs, one artist will be eliminated based on the ongoing public vote. A second artist will then be eliminated after the second round of performances. Ultimately, four artists will advance to the finale.

Due to the eliminations of Jared Grant and Melissa Janssen, this is the first time in two seasons that each coach will have equal representation in the finale.

Week 7: Final (January 29)

Notes

  The 4 Finalists (Jennie Lena, Brace, Maan de Steenwinkel, and Dave Vermeulen) sang "You're the Voice", while all of the previously eliminated artists accompanied them with background vocals.

Elimination Chart

Overall
Color key
Artist's info

Result details

Team
Color key
Artist's info

Result details

Artists' appearances in other media 
Danjil Tuhumena and Babette van Vugt turned chairs in Seasons 2 and 3 respectively, with the former competing on Team Nick en Simon and the latter on Team Borsato. Both were later eliminated in the Live Shows.
Melissa Meewisse participated in the inaugural season of The Voice Kids on Team Borsato in 2011. She was eliminated in the final round.
Kelvin Muïs placed third in the third season of the Dutch version of the reality singing competition, The X Factor, in 2010 as part of the "Boys" category.
Gaia Aikman and Dali Philippo participated in the Dutch singing competition Junior Songfestival in 2007 and 2013, respectively.
Melissa Janssen won the first season of the Dutch reality singing competition The Next Pop Talent in 2013.

Episodes

The Voice of Holland
2015 Dutch television seasons
2016 Dutch television seasons